George Shelton (March 4, 1884 - April 24, 1971) was an actor who did vaudeville shows, appeared in American comedy films, and was on the radio show It Pays to be Ignorant.  He appeared in about 40 films between 1933 and 1947.

He performed with Tom Howard. WNYC has a photo on its website of Shelton and fellow It Pays to Be Ignorant radio personalities Tom Howard, Harry McNaughton, and Lulu McConnell captioned as reading the newspaper comics by invitation of New York City Fiorello La Guardia during a 17-day newspaper strike, but the accompanying audio is a woman recounting her travels to the U.S.S.R.

In 1961 he interviewed Maurice Barrett about Bobby Clark.

He was a hoofer.

Filmography
How am I Doing! (1935)
Grooms in Gloom (1935)
Tranatlantic Love (1936), as Charlie Dalton
Meet the Bride (1937)
'"That's the Spirit (1937)House on 92nd Street (1945)Kiss of Death'' (1947)

References

1884 births
1971 deaths
Place of birth missing
American male radio actors
American male comedy actors
American male film actors
19th-century American male actors
20th-century American male actors
Vaudeville performers